Air Commodore Sir Arthur Dennis Mitchell  (26 May 1918 – 25 December 2001) was a British military pilot and commander.

Dennis Mitchell was educated at Bloxham School and Pangbourne College before becoming an air cadet at RAF Cranwell ad commissioning into the Royal Air Force. He flew multiple missions during the Second World War in the Far East and Europe. During the post-war 1940s Mitchell served at No 2 Group headquarters, British Air Forces of Occupation, No 84 Group and the Air Ministry, before learning to fly the Gloster Meteor, the RAF's first jet fighter.

Following brief command of No. 26 Squadron RAF, a Hawker Tempest squadron in Germany, he was posted to Brussels in 1948 as a member of an RAF delegation responsible for determining the needs of the future Belgian Air Force. In this period Mitchell met and married Comtesse Mireill Cornet de Ways Ruart.

He was decorated on several occasions, most notably being awarded a DFC and Bar in 1944 for his courageous leadership of squadrons under his command in the north-west Europe Campaign. From 1956 to 1959 he was Deputy Captain of the Queen's Flight and Captain from 1962 to 1964. In 1958 Mitchell was appointed Aide-de-Camp to Elizabeth II; he had been extra equerry since 1962. Mitchell was appointed KBE in 1977 and CVO in 1961. He was awarded the AFC in 1943 and French Croix de Guerre in 1945.

Mitchell died in 2001.

References

People educated at Bloxham School
1918 births
2001 deaths
Royal Air Force air commodores
Royal Air Force personnel of World War II
British World War II pilots
English aviators
Knights Commander of the Order of the British Empire
Graduates of the Royal Air Force College Cranwell
Commanders of the Royal Victorian Order
Recipients of the Distinguished Flying Cross (United Kingdom)
Recipients of the Air Force Cross (United Kingdom)